Cisthene tyres is a moth of the family Erebidae. It was described by Herbert Druce in 1897. It is found in Guatemala and Nicaragua.

References

Cisthenina
Moths described in 1897